Virgin Galactic Unity 21 was a sub-orbital spaceflight of the SpaceShipTwo-class VSS Unity which took place on 22 May 2021, piloted by David Mackay and co-piloted by Frederick Sturckow. It was the first human spaceflight from the state of New Mexico. It was operated by Virgin Galactic, a private company led by Richard Branson which intends to conduct space tourism flights in the future. Unity 21 was the first human spaceflight to be launched from Spaceport America.

Crew 

Flights are currently only by U.S Convention.

Flight 

On 22 May 2021, Unity's mother ship VMS Eve carried it into flight in a parasite configuration. At 15:26 UTC, Unity was drop launched. This altitude surpassed the 50-mile limit used in the United States to denote the limit of space, but fell short of the Kármán line. Both craft landed safely afterwards.

References 

2021 in spaceflight
SpaceShipTwo
Test spaceflights
Aviation history of the United States
Suborbital human spaceflights
2021 in New Mexico
2021 in aviation
May 2021 events in the United States